The 2013 Valdosta State Blazers football team represented Valdosta State University as a member of the Gulf South Conference (GSC) during the 2013 NCAA Division II football season. They were led by seventh year head coach David Dean and played their home games at Bazemore–Hyder Stadium in Valdosta, Georgia. The Blazers began the 2013 season ranked first in the American Football Coaches Association poll, the third time the Blazers have opened the season at No. 1. Valdosta State compiled an overall record of 6–4 with a mark of 3–3 in conference play, tying for fourth place in the GSC.

Schedule

References

Valdosta State
Valdosta State Blazers football seasons
Valdosta State Blazers football